Bob Robson may refer to:

 Bob Robson (soccer) (1957–1988), American association football player
 Bob Robson (politician), Arizona politician